is a Japanese voice actress from Tokyo, Japan.

She voiced Midna in The Legend of Zelda: Twilight Princess.

Filmography

Television animation

1998
Silent Möbius (Airport announcer)

2001
Otogi Story Tenshi no Shippo (Caster)
Comic Party (Beachside hut shop assistant, girl, others)
 (Eri)

2003
Astro Boy: Tetsuwan Atom (Ena)

OVA
Chō Shinki Dangaiser 3 (Natsuki)
Mizuiro (Kiyoka Onozaki)

Video games
Street Fighter Zero 3 (1998) (Cammy, Juli, Juni)
Namco × Capcom (2005) (Cammy, Juli, Juni)
The Legend of Zelda: Twilight Princess (2006) (Midna)
Soul Cradle: The World Eaters (2007) (Layna)
Hyrule Warriors (2014) (Midna)
Super Smash Bros. for Nintendo 3DS and Wii U (2014) (Midna)
Street Fighter V (2016) (Juni)
Super Smash Bros. Ultimate (2018) (Midna)
unknown date
120 Yen no Haru/120 Stories (Akiko)
Alnam's Wing: Shōjin no Sora no Kanatahe (Mayukoda)
Mizuiro (Kiyoka Onozaki)
NOëL ~mission on the line~ (Tomona Nishimura)

Tokusatsu
Power Rangers: Turbo (Vicky)

References

External links
 Official agency profile 
 
 

Living people
Arts Vision voice actors
Japanese video game actresses
Japanese voice actresses
Voice actresses from Tokyo
20th-century Japanese actresses
21st-century Japanese actresses
1969 births